Suffolk County Almshouse Barn is a historic hay and livestock barn located at Yaphank in Suffolk County, New York.  It was built in 1871 and the large multi-story barn has a broad gable roof and wood shingle sheathing.  It is the only extant structure from the Suffolk County Almshouse.

It was added to the National Register of Historic Places in 1986.

References

External links
THE SUFFOLK COUNTY ALMS-HOUSE from: "YAPHANK AS IT IS and WAS" by Beecher Homan 1875 (Longwood's Journey)

Barns on the National Register of Historic Places in New York (state)
Infrastructure completed in 1871
Buildings and structures in Suffolk County, New York
National Register of Historic Places in Suffolk County, New York